Fantastic is the debut studio album by British pop duo Wham!, released on 9 July 1983. It reached number one on the UK Albums Chart. It included the previously released singles "Young Guns", "Wham! Rap" and "Bad Boys". "Club Tropicana" was released as a single to coincide with the album's release. Although not on the album, "Club Fantastic Megamix" (a medley of songs from the album) was released against the band's wishes by Innervision soon after Fantastic, and whilst they were in proceedings to leave the label.

According to Andrew Ridgeley in his 2019 book Wham! George and Me, it was during the early stages of writing and recording of this album that the pair agreed that George Michael should take sole responsibility for writing the group's material. Before securing their first record deal, they had written songs together, and made their first demos with these songs. When work started in the studio, George Michael – according to Ridgeley – started working "at lightning speed", and it quickly became clear that he was by far the better songwriter. Andrew Ridgeley would later say that it was not something that he particularly wanted, but there was no doubt it was the way to go to achieve the success they both wanted. Two new songs, "Golden Soul" and "Soul Boy", were written by George and Andrew for the album but both were shelved as "neither of them were any good". (They have never been officially released but can be found on YouTube.) They were replaced by tracks written and arranged by George Michael.

The album features a hidden track (played on a honky-tonk-style piano) after the final 20 seconds of "Young Guns (Go for It!)".

In the U.S., the album was originally released as the group "WHAM! U.K.", due to a conflict with a U.S. group with the same name (Columbia BFC-38911).

Track listing

Original

Reissue
The track listing of the first edition of the CD and the original cassette tape feature three bonus tracks interspersed within the original track listing, consisting of instrumental remixes. This track listing was again used for the 1998 reissue of the CD.

Personnel 
Wham!
 George Michael – lead vocals (1-4, 7, 8), backing vocals (1, 2, 3), arrangements (4-7), all vocals (5, 6), horn arrangements (5), instruments (6)
 Andrew Ridgeley – guitars (1-5, 7, 8), arrangements (4)

Additional musicians
 Jess Bailey – keyboards (1)
 Anne Dudley – keyboards (1, 8)
 Tommy Eyre – keyboards (2, 3, 5, 7)
 Bob Carter – keyboards (4)
 Robert Ahwai – guitars (1, 2, 3, 7, 8)
 Deon Estus – bass (1, 2, 3, 5, 7), backing vocals (1)
 John McKenzie – bass (4)
 Brad Lang – bass (8)
 Trevor Murrell – drums (1, 2, 3, 5, 6)
 Andy Duncan – drums (4), percussion (4, 5)
 Graham Broad – drums (7, 8)
 Luís Jardim – percussion (1, 3)
 Tony Moroni – percussion (2)
 Jeff Daly – saxophones (1)
 David Baptiste – saxophones (2, 3, 7)
 Chris Hunter – saxophones (4)
 Ian Ritchie – saxophones (5), horn arrangements (5)
 Andy Mackintosh – saxophones (8)
 Paul Cox – trumpet (1)
 Martin Drover – trumpet (1)
 Colin Graham – trumpet (2, 3, 7)
 Raul D'Oliveria – trumpet (2, 3, 7)
 Guy Barker – trumpet (4)
 Roddy Lorimer – trumpet (5)
 Bert Ezard – trumpet (8)
 J. Healey – trumpet (8)
 Linton Ace – string arrangements (3)
 Dee C. Lee – backing vocals (1, 8)
 Ruby Mason – backing vocals (1)
 Jimmy Chambers – backing vocals (3)
 George Chandler – backing vocals (3)
 Tony Jackson – backing vocals (3)
 Katie Kissoon – backing vocals (7)
 Stevie Lange – backing vocals (7)
 Sylvia Mason-James – backing vocals (7)
 Lynda Hayes – backing vocals (8)
 Shirlie Holliman – backing vocals (8)
 Josie James – backing vocals (8)

Shouting on "Wham Rap! (Enjoy What You Do?)"
 Bob Carter, George Michael, David Mortimer, Andrew Ridgeley and Paul Ridgeley

Handclaps on "Club Tropicana"
 Deon Estus, Steve Evans, George Michael, Andrew Ridgeley and Phil Wilcox

Production 
 George Michael – producer (1, 2, 3, 5-8)
 Steve Brown – producer (1, 2, 3, 5-8)
 Bob Carter – producer (4)
 Tony Taverner – engineer
 Wham! – cover design 
 Shoot That Tiger! – cover design 
 Chris Craymer – front cover photography, inner sleeve photography 
 Janusz Guttner – inner sleeve photography

Charts

Weekly charts

Year-end charts

Certifications and sales

Club Fantastic Tour

Michael and Ridgeley embarked on a UK tour to promote the album in October 1983, opening at Aberdeen's Capitol Theatre, before going on to dates in Scotland, England and Wales, and ending in November at the Centre in Brighton.

See also
Club Fantastic Tour

References

1983 debut albums
Wham! albums
Columbia Records albums
Innvervision Records albums